is a Japanese footballer currently playing as a defender for Gainare Tottori.

Club career
While studying at the Hiroshima Shudo University, Nagai was announced as a Gainare Tottori player ahead of the 2022 season.

Career statistics

Club
.

Notes

References

2000 births
Living people
Association football people from Ehime Prefecture
Hiroshima Shudo University alumni
Japanese footballers
Association football defenders
J3 League players
Gainare Tottori players